James Downey Craig (born May 31, 1957) is an American former ice hockey goaltender who is best known for being part of the U.S. Olympic hockey team that won the gold medal at the 1980 Winter Olympics. Craig had a standout Olympic tournament, including stopping 36 of 39 shots on goal by the heavily favored Soviet Union in the 'Miracle on Ice', as the U.S. won 4–3, in what is widely considered one of the greatest upsets in sports history. Two days later, the U.S. defeated Finland, 4–2, to clinch Olympic gold. Craig went on to play professionally in the National Hockey League for the Atlanta Flames, Boston Bruins, and Minnesota North Stars from 1980 to 1983.

Playing career

Amateur career
After starring at Oliver Ames High School in his hometown, Craig spent one year at Massasoit Community College in Brockton, Massachusetts. He then transferred to Boston University, leading the Terriers to the NCAA Division I championship in 1978 and was an NCAA All-Star in 1979. He was inducted into the BU Hall of Fame in 1989.

1980 Winter Olympics
Craig played a key role in one of the landmark moments in United States sports history, as the goalie for the United States in the Miracle on Ice, when the 1980 U.S. Olympic hockey team defeated the favored Soviet Olympic hockey team, which was led by greats including Boris Mikhailov and Vladislav Tretiak. In that game, Craig stopped 36 of 39 shots from the Soviet team. His composure was evident in the final moments of the game and allowed the underdog U.S. team to protect their one-goal lead and win 4–3. The American Flag that Craig draped over his shoulders after the upset is now displayed at the Sports Museum of America in New York City. Two days later, he again led the U.S. to victory, 4–2 victory over Finland, clinching the gold medal.

Professional career
Originally drafted by the Atlanta Flames with the 72nd pick in the 1977 NHL Entry Draft, Craig joined the Flames shortly after the Olympics and won his first game as an NHL professional. However, he found it difficult to duplicate his magic in the NHL. The following season, the Boston Bruins brought him home to Massachusetts in a trade with Atlanta. He served as the Bruins' backup goaltender during the 1980-81 regular season but again failed to make an impression and he did not participate in the 1981 NHL Playoffs. Craig returned to the U.S. national team for the 1981 Canada Cup but missed the tournament due to injury and the following season was spent in the minor leagues with the Erie Blades. Craig's final moment of glory was in 1983 when he again played very well for the United States in the 1983 IIHF Pool B tournament. Craig was named goaltender of the tournament and the Minnesota North Stars promptly signed him to a free agent contract. He would make a final three NHL appearances for the North Stars in 1984 before retiring from hockey.

Personal life
Two years after the Lake Placid victory, he was issued a citation "charging him with driving to endanger after an accident on a rain-slicked highway that left one woman dead and another critically injured." Although neither alcohol nor drugs was a factor in the accident, the charge was later changed to motor vehicle homicide. He pleaded not guilty and waived his right to a jury trial, electing to go before a judge instead. He was found not guilty by a Wareham District Court judge in September 1982.

Craig is employed as a motivational speaker, spokesperson, marketing and sales strategist. He is president of Gold Medal Strategies, a Boston-area based promotions and marketing firm that also manages and represents Jim and his appearance business. Over the past 25 years, Craig has provided strategic direction for employees and associates from more than 300 organizations.

His daughter Taylor is married to NHL player Jayson Megna.

Musician Dave Grohl has mentioned being an admirer of Craig over the years, as evidenced by the #6 entry of the "47 Things You Might Not Know About Dave Grohl" list on TeamRock.com, which stated, "Dave’s first hero was Jim Craig, the 1980 American ice hockey team goalie from Easton, Massachusetts. After the team beat Russia, he found the phone numbers of all the Jim Craigs in that area, phoned them up and congratulated them. Dave and the real Jim Craig met years later at a Winter Olympics."

In popular culture
In the 1981 made-for-TV movie film Miracle on Ice, Craig is portrayed by Steve Guttenberg.

In the 2004 Disney film Miracle, he is portrayed by Eddie Cahill, who considers Craig to be one of his childhood heroes.

Career statistics

Regular season and playoffs

International

Awards and achievements
ECAC First All-Star Team (1979)
NCAA East First All-American Team (1979)
Olympic Gold Medal Team U.S.A (1980)
Ice Hockey World Championships B Pool Tournament All-Star Team (1983)
Inducted into International Hockey Hall of Fame in 1999

References

External links

Jim Craig USA Website

1957 births
Living people
1980 US Olympic ice hockey team
AHCA Division I men's ice hockey All-Americans
American men's ice hockey goaltenders
Atlanta Flames draft picks
Atlanta Flames players
Boston Bruins players
Boston University Terriers men's ice hockey players
Cincinnati Stingers draft picks
Erie Blades players
Ice hockey players at the 1980 Winter Olympics
Ice hockey players from Massachusetts
IIHF Hall of Fame inductees
Medalists at the 1980 Winter Olympics
Minnesota North Stars players
NCAA men's ice hockey national champions
Olympic gold medalists for the United States in ice hockey
People from Easton, Massachusetts
Salt Lake Golden Eagles (CHL) players
United States Hockey Hall of Fame inductees